The Bop Session is an album by jazz legends Dizzy Gillespie, Sonny Stitt, John Lewis, Hank Jones, Percy Heath and Max Roach recorded in 1975 and released on the Swedish Sonet label.

Reception
The Allmusic review stated "Bop fans should enjoy this date despite the lack of surprises".

Track listing
 "Blues 'N Boogie" (Dizzy Gillespie, Felix Paparelli) - 9:30
 "Confirmation" (Charlie Parker) - 8:31
 "Groovin' High" (Gillespie) - 7:17
 "Lover Man (Oh, Where Can You Be?)" (Jimmy Davis, Ram Ramirez, James Sherman) - 6:58
 "All the Things You Are" (Oscar Hammerstein II, Jerome Kern) - 9:54
 "Lady Bird" (Tadd Dameron) - 8:24

Personnel
Dizzy Gillespie - trumpet
Sonny Stitt - alto saxophone, tenor saxophone
John Lewis (tracks 1 & 5), Hank Jones (tracks 2-4 & 6) - piano
Percy Heath - bass
Max Roach - drums

References 

Sonet Records albums
Sonny Stitt albums
Dizzy Gillespie albums
John Lewis (pianist) albums
Hank Jones albums
Max Roach albums
Albums produced by Samuel Charters
1975 albums